Trigonopterus pseudoflorensis is a species of flightless weevil in the genus Trigonopterus from Indonesia.

Etymology
The specific name is derived from the Greek word pseudo-, meaning "false", combined with the specific name of the related species T. florensis.

Description
Individuals measure 1.70–2.14 mm in length.  General coloration is black, except for the legs and head, which are rust-colored.

Range

Phylogeny
T. pseudoflorensis is part of the T. relictus species group.  It bears morphological similarities to T. florensis and T. paraflorensis.

References

pseudoflorensis
Beetles described in 2014
Beetles of Asia
Insects of Indonesia